The 1991–92 European Cup was the 37th season of the European Cup football club tournament. It was the first European Cup to have a group stage, from which the winning clubs progressed to the final. 1991–92 was the tournament's last edition before it was re-branded as the UEFA Champions League.

The group stage involved the eight winning clubs from round 2. The clubs were split into two groups of four, playing each other home and away, and the winning club from each group met in the 1992 European Cup Final.

The competition was won for the first time by Barcelona after extra time in the final against Sampdoria, the first victory in the tournament by a team from Spain since 1966. The winning goal was scored by Ronald Koeman with a free kick.

The defending champions, Red Star Belgrade, did not have an opportunity to play at their own ground because of the Yugoslav Wars, thereby reducing their chances of defending their title. Red Star were eliminated in the group stage. It was also the final season in which the clubs from that country were able to participate in the primary European football competition. The clubs from some other former Yugoslav republics were allowed to compete as early as in the 1993–94 season, but due to UN embargo it was only in 1997–98 when the clubs from Federal Republic of Yugoslavia returned to what was now the UEFA Champions League.

In addition, it was the last time an East German team competed in the European Cup, Hansa Rostock.

English clubs returned to the European Cup, after their five-year ban from European competitions following the Heysel Stadium disaster in 1985. The 1990 Football League champions Liverpool had been unable to participate in the 1990–91 European Cup because they had been banned for an additional sixth year. Arsenal represented England in 1991–92, and reached the second round.

Teams
A total of 32 teams participated in the competition, all entering into the first round.

Notes

First round

Second round

Group stage

Group A

Group B

Final

Top scorers

The top scorers from the 1991–92 European Cup are as follows:

External links
1991–92 All matches – season at UEFA website
European Cup results at Rec.Sport.Soccer Statistics Foundation
 All scorers 1991–92 European Cup according to protocols UEFA
1991/92 European Cup - results and line-ups (archive)

 
1991–92 in European football
European Champion Clubs' Cup seasons